Marijo Osibov (born 30 March 1973 in Split) is a retired Croatian football player who played for Hajduk Split and other Croatian and foreign clubs.

External sources
 
 
 

1973 births
Living people
Footballers from Split, Croatia
Croatian footballers
Yugoslav footballers
HNK Hajduk Split players
NK Zadar players
NK Inter Zaprešić players
NK Zagreb players
Hapoel Petah Tikva F.C. players
NK Lučko players
Yugoslav First League players
Croatian Football League players
Israeli Premier League players
Croatian expatriate footballers
Expatriate footballers in Israel
Croatian expatriate sportspeople in Israel
Association football defenders
HNK Hajduk Split non-playing staff